Behsudi or Behsud are one of the major tribes of the Hazara people in Afghanistan.

History 
The notable history of the Behsud tribe starts from the 19th-century when the 19th-century Behsud chieftain Mir Yazdan Bakhsh was one of the first Hazara chiefs, who tried in vain to unify all Hazaras.
In the Hazara resistance against the Soviet Union and later the Taliban most of the modern Hazara political leadership has emerged from the Behsuds. Afghan leaders from the Behsud tribe include Sultan Ali Keshtmand, the Prime Minister of Afghanistan from 1981 to 1989.

Notable people 
 Karim Khalili, former vice president of Afghanistan.
 Sultan Ali Keshtmand, the communist Prime Minister of Afghanistan (1981–1990).
 Mir Yazdan Bakhsh, an early 19th-century Hazara chieftain.
 Sharbat Ali Changezi, Air Marshall Pakistan Air Force.
 Haji Kazim Yazdani,  historical researcher and writer.
 Rohullah Nikpai, Taekwondo practitioner and two-time Olympic bronze medalist.

See also 
 List of Hazara tribes
 Hazara people

Sources 
 The Hazaras by Hassan Poladi
 The Hazaras of Afghanistan by Sayd Askar Musavi
 Hazaras of Afghanistan by Taimor Khanov, translated in Urdu by Hasan Raza Changazi

Hazara tribes
Ethnic groups in Maidan Wardak Province